Maj. Harsh Vardhan Bahuguna  (1939 – April 18, 1971) was a leading mountaineer of India and a military officer. He was an instructor of skiing and mountaineering at the High Altitude Warfare School, Gulmarg and had successfully climbed many mountains.

Death
He died as part of the international expedition on Mount Everest on April 18, 1971. That was his second attempt. He had to abort his first expedition in 1965 just 400 feet short of the summit.
Fourteen years later, in October 1985 his younger brother, Major Jai Vardhan Bahuguna, also lost his life in a Mount Everest expedition of the Indian Army, along with four other army officers. Neither of the brothers would summit Mount  Everest and both died near the same area in their second attempts.

Awards
He was posthumously awarded the Padma Shri by Government of India in 1972.

References

Indian mountain climbers
1939 births
1971 deaths
Mountaineering deaths on Mount Everest
Sportspeople from Dehradun
Recipients of the Padma Shri in sports
Indian Army officers
Military personnel from Uttarakhand
Recipients of the Arjuna Award